Padomju Jaunatne (Soviet Youth) was a daily newspaper for young people published in Latvia between 1944 and 1993.

History
Padomju Jaunatne was published by the Leninist Young Communist League of Latvia (LĻKJS), the branch of the all-Union Komsomol in the Latvian Soviet Socialist Republic. It served as an organ of the LĻKJS until the organization's dissolution in 1991, but continued to be published under the new title Latvijas Jaunatne (Latvian Youth) until late 1993.

References

1944 establishments in the Soviet Union
1993 disestablishments in Latvia
Defunct newspapers published in Latvia
Latvian-language newspapers
Publications disestablished in 1993